Veliki Lipovec may refer to:

 Veliki Lipovec, Slovenia, a village near Žužemberk
 Veliki Lipovec, Croatia, a village near Samobor